Mikhail Fyodorovich Karyukov  was a Soviet film director, cinematographer and screenwriter. He was born in Odessa, Russian Empire.

From 1923 to 1925 he studied at the economic faculty of Trade-Industrial College. In 1925 he graduated from the projectional courses at the Odessa State College of Cinematographers (ГТК). In 1930 he joined the cinematographic department of the Odessa Cinema College. He is the special effects designer and organizer of the special effects department at various studios. Since 1955, he is the cinematographer of the Odessa Film Studio. In 1939 he wrote New ways of combined shooting (Новые способы комбинированных съёмок). Co-author of his film scripts and the film Pakhta-Oi (Пахта-Ой).

Filmography
1941 – Mysterious Island  
1955 – The Shadow Near the Pier
1960 – The Heavens Call  (translit. Nebo zovyot)
1963 – A Dream Come True   
1966 – Queen of Blood

References

External links

Soviet film directors
Science fiction film directors
Soviet screenwriters
Male screenwriters
Soviet cinematographers
1905 births
1992 deaths
Film people from Odesa
20th-century screenwriters
Special effects people